The Ministry of Transport and Communications (Spanish: Ministerio del Poder Popular para el Transporte y Comunicaciones "Ministry of Popular Power for Transportation and Communications", MTC) of Venezuela was created in June 2010, to cover transport and communications in Venezuela. Its creation saw the disappearance of the Ministry of Public Works and Housing (Ministerio del Poder Popular para las Obras Públicas y Vivienda), split into this ministry and the Ministerio del Poder Popular para Vivienda y Hábitat. Its headquarters were in the Torre MTC in Chacao, Caracas, Miranda. In November 2011 Hugo Chávez, President of Venezuela, announced that the MTC would be divided into two ministries, the Ministry of Aquatic and Air Transport and the Ministry of Ground Transport.

Responsibilities
Among other responsibilities the ministry covered the air accident investigation body (Junta Investigadora de Accidentes de Aviación Civil), Simón Bolívar International Airport (Venezuela) and the airline Conviasa; and the railways agency Instituto de Ferrocarriles del Estado and various metro systems including the Caracas Metro. Conviasa, the airport, and the new air accident investigation body are now under the Ministry of Aquatic and Air Transport (Ministerio del Poder Popular para Transporte Acuático y Aéreo).

Ministers

References

External links

 www.mtc.gob.ve 

Transport
Venezuela
Transport organizations based in Venezuela